

This is a list of the National Register of Historic Places listings in Glenn County, California.

This is intended to be a complete list of the properties and districts on the National Register of Historic Places in Glenn County, California, United States. Latitude and longitude coordinates are provided for many National Register properties and districts; these locations may be seen together in a Google map.

There are 2 properties and districts listed on the National Register in the county.

Current listings

|}

See also

List of National Historic Landmarks in California
National Register of Historic Places listings in California
California Historical Landmarks in Glenn County, California

References

Glenn
Buildings and structures in Glenn County, California
History of Glenn County, California